Ismail Mahomed SCOB SC (5 July 1931 – 17 June 2000) was a South African lawyer who served as the Chief Justice of South Africa and the Chief Justice of Namibia, and co-authored the constitution of Namibia.

Early life

Mahomed was born in Pretoria; his parents were Indian immigrant merchants. He graduated from Pretoria Indian Boys' High School in 1950. He received his BA from University of the Witwatersrand in 1953 and the following year received his BA (Hons) with distinction in political science. He finished his Bachelor of Laws in 1957.

Career

Mahomed was refused admission to the Pretoria Bar Association, as it was reserved for white lawyers, but was able to join the Johannesburg Bar Association. However, because of the Group Areas Act, he was banned from getting a Chambers of his own, and had to join the Chambers of a White Senior Advocate. In the 1960s he was briefed extensively to appear in matters in Botswana, Lesotho, and Rhodesia, being briefed mostly in matters related to contractual recovery of monies and debts, summary suits, and suits for specific performance and contractual damages in real estate deals. In 1974 he became the first non-white in South African history to take silk. He became noted for accepting briefs on behalf of even embattled Afrikaner farmers who were battling Banks seeking to enforce mortgages on farmland, and in this earned considerable goodwill even among the White farming community. All this while, he continued to appear in Bail and habeas corpus hearings for ANC activists  He was made an English Barrister in 1984. In 1991 he became the chair of the Convention for a Democratic South Africa and the country's first non-white judge of the Supreme Court of South Africa. He was later appointed to the Appeal Court. He was made a judge of the Constitutional Court in 1995. In 1996 he was made the Chief Justice of South Africa by President Nelson Mandela.

Death
Mahomed died of pancreatic cancer in Johannesburg on 17 June 2000, shortly after leaving the bench. Sam Nujoma, the Namibian President at that time, spoke at his funeral.

Honours and awards
At the Supreme Court of Namibia there is a statue in his honour.
He was posthumously awarded the Order of the Baobab (Gold) in 2002.

References

1931 births
2000 deaths
Chief justices of Namibia
Chief justices of South Africa
Judges of the Constitutional Court of South Africa
South African judges
South African judges on the courts of Lesotho
South African judges on the courts of Namibia
University of the Witwatersrand alumni
Muslim South African anti-apartheid activists
South African people of Indian descent
People from Pretoria
South African Muslims
South African judges on the courts of Eswatini
20th-century South African lawyers
Order of the Baobab